The Oxnard Elementary School District is located in the city of Oxnard, California. The district serves 16,500+ students, has 21 schools, and has over 700 teachers.

Student makeup
The ethnic makeup is: 85% Hispanic, 8% White, 4% Asian, and 3% African American.

The gender makeup of the students is: 51% male and 49% female

History
In 2019, the use of glyphosate-based weed-killing products at the schools was banned by the board. Concerns have been raised about the mounting litigation over the safety of glyphosate and conflicting research findings on the risk of cancer upon exposure to the product. In 2018 a California jury awarded significant damages to a groundskeeper who argued that Monsanto provided inadequate warnings of cancer risks posed by the herbicides.

References

External links
 

School districts in Ventura County, California
Education in Oxnard, California